Falcon and Snowman may refer to:
 Andrew Daulton Lee (Falcon) and Christopher John Boyce (Snowman), Americans who were spies for the Soviets
 The Falcon and the Snowman: A True Story of Friendship and Espionage, a 1979 non-fiction espionage book by Robert Lindsey
 The Falcon and the Snowman, a 1985 U.S. spy film
 The Falcon and the Snowman (album), a 1985 soundtrack album

See also
 The Falcon and the Winter Soldier, a 2021 TV series